Dr. Ron S. Dembo is an academic and entrepreneur.

Academia 
From 1976 to 1986, Dembo was a professor at Yale University, where he was cross appointed between the Department of Computer Science and the School of Management. During that period, he was also a visiting professor at MIT. He has published work on finance and mathematical optimization, and holds a number of patents in computational finance, climate change and software engineering.

Entrepreneurship 
Dembo was founder and CEO of Algorithmic's Incorporated. Algorithmic's was sold to Fitch in 2005 and later to IBM in 2012. It has since been acquired by SS&C.

In 2005, Dembo founded Zerofootprint Software, a Toronto-based, cleantech software and services company. In the same year, he founded the non-profit Zerofootprint Foundation which won gold in the Climate Change category at the Canadian Environment Awards in 2008. In 2009, Dembo also established the ZERO prize, a one million dollar prize for a design to retrofit a concrete building built between 1945 and 1990.

He currently sits on a number of boards and is a member of the Climate Change Adaptation Advisory Committee Canada and was appointed to the Steering Committee of the World Urban Campaign, coordinated by UN-Habitat.

Awards 
In May 2007, Dembo was made a lifetime Fields Institute Fellow. This fellowship is awarded to individuals who have made outstanding contributions to the Fields Institute, its programs, and to the Canadian mathematical community. Dembo's alma mater, the University of Waterloo, honored Dembo with a Distinguished Alumni Achievement Medal for Professional Achievement in business and climate change, 2007.

In 2009, Dembo was appointed to the Steering Committee of the World Urban Campaign, coordinated by UN-Habitat. In 2008, he received a Green Toronto Award from the City of Toronto for his work with Zerofootprint, as well as a Certificate of Recognition, Champion of Green from the Government of Ontario.

Books 
Dembo is the author of three books: Seeing Tomorrow: Rewriting the Rules of Risk, co-authored with Andrew Freeman, published in April 1998; Upside Downside: Simple Rules of Risk Management for the Smart Investor, co-authored with Daniel Stoffman, published in March 2006; and Everything You Wanted to Know About Offsetting But Were Afraid to Ask, co-authored with Clive Davidson and released in May 2007. His latest book, Risk Thinking, will be published in 2021.

References 

Canadian businesspeople
Canadian non-fiction writers
Year of birth missing (living people)
Living people
University of Waterloo alumni
20th-century South African economists
Financial economists
Technion – Israel Institute of Technology alumni
University of the Witwatersrand alumni